This is a list of British television related events from 1966.

Events

January
1 January – The first edition of Rugby Special is broadcast on BBC2, showing weekly highlights of rugby union matches.
3 January – Stop-motion children's television series Camberwick Green, first of the 'Trumptonshire' trilogy, is first shown on BBC1 as part of Watch with Mother; it is the channel's first programme to be filmed in colour, although transmitted in black and white at this time.
4 January – More than 4,000 people attend a memorial service at Westminster Abbey for the broadcaster Richard Dimbleby, who died last month aged 52.
15 January – BBC2 goes on air in the South and West of England.

February
No events.

March
3 March – The BBC announces plans to begin broadcasting television programmes in colour from next year.
10 March – The Frost Report, which launches the television careers of John Cleese, Ronnie Barker and Ronnie Corbett and other writers and performers, is first broadcast on BBC1
22 March – ITV launch How, the educational children's programme hosted by Jack Hargreaves and Fred Dinenage.

April
5 April – The Money Programme debuts on BBC2. It continues to air until 2010.
7 April–24 September – Weavers Green, made by Anglia Television, airs on ITV in 49 half-hour episodes twice-weekly, it is the first rural soap opera on British television and one of the first television programmes to be shot on location using videotape and outside broadcast equipment, rather than film, as has usually been the case for non-studio shooting until this point.
21 April – The opening of the Parliament of the United Kingdom is televised for the first time.

May
21 May – ITV Midlands (ABC) and ITV London and Southern begin broadcasting the American live-action series Batman, starring Adam West and Burt Ward.  Other ITV regions broadcast it soon afterwards, with STV first showing it on 2nd July, and Border on 13th August. Episodes are shown in two parts over Saturday and Sunday evenings. 
23 May – Julie Goodyear makes her Coronation Street debut as Bet Lynch. She will become a regular character between 1970 and 1995.

June
6 June – BBC1 sitcom Till Death Us Do Part begins its first series run.
11 June – BBC2 Northern Ireland goes on the air.
16 June – The Beatles perform live on BBC television's Top of the Pops, the UK's major television pop music show, for the first and only time, miming to both "Paperback Writer" and its b-side, "Rain". The appearance is subsequently lost due to the BBC's habit of wiping expensive video tape for reuse, but in 2019 a collector unearths 11 seconds of the performance and a longer 92 seconds is found later in the year.

July
9 July – BBC2 Scotland goes on the air, the last regional area to receive BBC2 (including the Gaelic language strand BBC Dhà Alba). It ceases broadcasting on 17 February 2019 to make way for the new BBC Scotland channel launching on 24 February 2019.
30 July – England beat West Germany 4-2 to win the 1966 World Cup at Wembley, attracting an all-time record UK television audience of more than 32,000,000.

Summer
Summer – Patrick McGoohan quits the popular spy series Danger Man after filming only two episodes of the fourth season, in order to produce and star in The Prisoner which begins filming in September.

August
No events.

September
No events.

October
2 October
The four-part serial Talking to a Stranger, acclaimed as one of the finest British television dramas of the 1960s, begins transmission in the Theatre 625 strand on BBC2.
Thunderbirds is back with a second season on ITV but without David Holliday (the original voice of Virgil Tracy) as he is now replaced by Jeremy Wilkin and running only for six episodes.
8 October – First episode of the Doctor Who serial The Tenth Planet aired, introducing the Cybermen.
29 October – Actor William Hartnell makes his last regular appearance as the First Doctor in the concluding moments of Episode 4 of the Doctor Who serial The Tenth Planet. Patrick Troughton briefly appears as the Second Doctor at the conclusion of the serial.

November
5 November – Patrick Troughton appears in his first full Doctor Who serial The Power of the Daleks as the Second Doctor.
16 November – BBC television drama Cathy Come Home, filmed in a docudrama style, is broadcast on BBC1's The Wednesday Play anthology strand. Viewed by a quarter of the British population, it is considered influential on public attitudes to homelessness and the related social issues it deals with, becoming possibly the best-known play ever to be broadcast on British television. It was written by Jeremy Sandford, produced by Tony Garnett and directed by Ken Loach.

December
25 December – The final episode of Thunderbirds is broadcast on ITV.
28 December – Jonathan Miller's production of Alice in Wonderland is broadcast.

Debuts

BBC1
1 January – The Spies (1966)
3 January – The Trumptonshire Trilogy: Camberwick Green (1966)
5 January – Softly, Softly (1966–1969)
16 January – David Copperfield (1966)
10 March – The Frost Report (1966)
7 May – Quick Before They Catch Us (1966)
17 May – All Gas and Gaiters (1966–1971)
24 May – Beggar My Neighbour (1966–1968)
14 June – Room at the Bottom (1966)
19 June – Thirteen Against Fate  (1966)
23 June – Adam Adamant Lives! (1966–1967)
6 July – King of the River (1966–1967)
2 August – The Reluctant Romeo (1966–1967)
7 August – It's a Knockout (BBC1 1966–1982, Channel 5 1999–2001)
18 August – Dusty (1966–1967)
5 September – Jennings (1966)
16 September – Foreign Affairs (1966)
2 October – The Woman in White (1966)
3 October – Joe (1966–1971)
15 October – The Late Show (1966–1967)
17 October - Daktari (1966–1969)
28 October – Harry Worth (1966–1970)
4 November – Vendetta (1966–1968)
13 November – The Three Musketeers (1966)
17 November – The Illustrated Weekly Hudd (1966–1967)
28 December – Alice in Wonderland (1966)
31 December – The Monkees (broadcast on BBC1 in black & white)

BBC2
7 January – This Man Craig (1966–1967)
11 January – The Idiot (1966)
15 January – The Man in the Mirror (1966)
15 February – A Farewell to Arms (1966)
26 February – A Game of Murder (1966)
8 March – The Hunchback of Notre Dame (1966)
19 March – Mild and Bitter (1966)
5 April – The Money Programme (1966–2010)
10 April – Take a Pair of Private Eyes (1966)
26 April – Lord Raingo (1966)
16 June – This Is Petula Clark (1966–1968)
18 June 
Chronicle (1966–1991)
Cooperama (1966)
19 June – Watch the Birdies (1966)
23 July – Mr. John Jorrocks (1966)
20 September – North and South (1966)
2 October – Talking to a Stranger (1966) (originally shown on Theatre 625 anthology series)
20 October – Breaking Point (1966)
25 October – Broome Stages (1966)
9 November – On the Margin (1966)
16 November – Cathy Come Home (1966)
26 November –  Bat Out of Hell (1966)
31 December –  The Dark Number (1966–1967)

ITV
7 January – The Liars (1966)
11 January – The Master (1966)
29 January – Mystery and Imagination (1966–1970)
2 February – The Rat Catchers  (1966–1967)
22 February – Object Z Returns (1966)
14 March – Mrs Thursday (1966–1967)
22 March – How (1966–1981)
7 April – Weavers Green (1966)
14 April – The Untouchables (1959–1963)
9 May – Seven Deadly Sins (1966)
21 May – Batman (1966–1968)
7 July – You Can't Win (1966)
3 August – The Informer (1966–1967)
26 August – The Corridor People (1966)
23 September – Conflict (1966–1969)
28 September – The Baron (1966–1967)
29 September – The New Forest Rustlers (1966)
1 October 
 All Square (1966–1967)
 Intrigue (1966)
19 November – George and the Dragon (1966–1968)
31 December – Life with Cooper (1966–1969)
Unknown – I Dream of Jeannie (1965–1970)

Continuing television shows

1920s
BBC Wimbledon (1927–1939, 1946–2019, 2021–2024)

1930s
The Boat Race (1938–1939, 1946–2019)
BBC Cricket (1939, 1946–1999, 2020–2024)

1940s
Come Dancing (1949–1998)

1950s
Andy Pandy (1950–1970, 2002–2005)
Watch with Mother (1952–1975) 
The Good Old Days (1953–1983)
Panorama (1953–present)
Sunday Night at the London Palladium (1955–1967, 1973–1974)
Take Your Pick! (1955–1968, 1992–1998)
Double Your Money (1955–1968)
Dixon of Dock Green (1955–1976)
Crackerjack (1955–1984, 2020–present)
Opportunity Knocks (1956–1978, 1987–1990)
This Week (1956–1978, 1986–1992)
Armchair Theatre (1956–1974)
What the Papers Say (1956–2008)
The Sky at Night (1957–present)
Blue Peter (1958–present)
Grandstand (1958–2007)

1960s
Coronation Street (1960–present)
The Avengers (1961–1969)
Songs of Praise (1961–present)
Hugh and I (1962–1967)
The Saint (1962–1969)
Z-Cars (1962–1978)
Animal Magic (1962–1983)
Doctor Who (1963–1989, 1996, 2005–present)
World in Action (1963–1998)
The Wednesday Play (1964–1970)
Top of the Pops (1964–2006)
Match of the Day (1964–present)
Crossroads (1964–1988, 2001–2003)
Play School (1964–1988)
Mr. and Mrs. (1965–1999) 
The Newcomers (1965–1969)
Not Only... But Also (1965–1970)
World of Sport (1965–1985)
Call My Bluff (1965–2005)
Jackanory (1965–1996, 2006)

Ending this year
 Captain Pugwash (1957–1966, 1974–1975, 1997–2002)
 The Flintstones (1960–1966)
 Thank Your Lucky Stars (1961–1966)
 Marriage Lines (1963–1966) 
 Our Man at St. Mark's (1963–1966)
 Ready Steady Go! (1963–1966)
 The Likely Lads (1964–1966)
 Redcap (1964–1966)
 BBC-3 (1965–1966)
 The Bed-Sit Girl (1965–1966)
 Thunderbirds (1965–1966)
 Stingray (1965–1966)

Births
 13 January – Shelagh Fogarty, radio and television presenter
 26 February – Fay Ripley, actress and recipe author
 6 March – Alan Davies, comedian and actor
 22 March – Samantha Robson, actress
 1 April – Chris Evans, radio DJ and presenter 
 14 April – Lloyd Owen, actor
 19 June – Samuel West, actor
 5 July – Susannah Doyle, actress, playwright and film director
 12 July – Tamsin Greig, actress 
 16 July – Johnny Vaughan, broadcaster and journalist
 23 July – Samantha Beckinsale, actress
 30 August – Helen Fospero, newsreader and journalist
 26 October – Steve Valentine, actor

See also
 1966 in British music
 1966 in British radio
 1966 in the United Kingdom
 List of British films of 1966

References